The discography of Amir Tataloo, a singer and songwriter. So far, he has released 17 studio albums, 1 live album, 48 music videos and 131 official singles. He started his professional activity in 2002.

Studio albums 
 Zire Hamkaf (2012)
 Tatality (2014)
 Man (2015)
 Somare 6 (2016)
 Mamnoo (2016)
 Somare 7 (2017)
 Gahraman (2018)
 Amir (2018)
 Sayeh (2019)
 Jahanam (2020)
 Barzakh (2020)
 78 (2020)
 Seytan (2020)
 Angel (2021)
 Sahm (2021)
 Boht (2022)
 Cosmos (completing)

Singles 

 Go away from me
 Vageiat
 Gorbe Sefat
 Nmikamet
 Cesham Nadid 
 Sanse Akhar
 Man O To 
 Diroz Ta Emroz
 Arosake Be Cesmoro
 Cesmhaye Gorbeh
 Gavutar Az Hamiseh
 Besin Kenaram
 Man O On
 Hezaro Yek Shab
 Bageh Vahs
 Emshab Bemon
 Tamaso Karis Nakon
 Gorbeh Nareh
 Valentain
 Gafas
 To Cesam Bekhon
 Baray Rap
 Ashti Kon
 Aghar Rozi 
 Galbam
 Ba Man Bash
 Hal Giri
 Gir Midadi 
 Be Marefat
 Delbar
 Rafti Ama To Bedon
 Hanoz Yadesh Hast
 Gigily
 Hala Ke Jibam Kalie
 Dokhtare Rashti
 Bi To Mitarsam
 Esgeh Na
 Fagre
 Bro Az Pishe Man 2
 Bego Cera
 Ritm Shargi
 Kodahafez
 Gere Kamar
 Bosgab
 Khanom Khanomha
 Fardaye Ma
 Oj Esgeh
 Raz Amir
 Donya Nia
 Miram Az Pishet
 Alo Manam
 Bavaram Nmiseh
 Tanham Gozast
 Tarkam Nakhon 
 Bro 
 Pedar
 Bego To Che Mikhay
 Mano Bebakhs
 Banoye Avaz
 Misnavam Migi
 Intro
 Zangir
 Gire Mostagim
 Gosaro Bikhyal
 Pishe
 Iran Sabz
 Vay Ke Che Haleye
 Vagti Ke Baron MIgireh
 Mari Jom
 Tavalodet Mobarak
 Na Doroge
 Benze Germez
 Bego Bebinam Nadidis
 Ival
 Che Kareye
 Zire Sagfeh Tehron
 Yeki Behes Zang Bezaneh
 Parasto
 Ro Pam Vaysadam
 Hoge Baze
 Mano Dari
 To Be Harfe Man Gosh Kon
 Bemon Ba Man
 Bonbast
 Ino Midonam Ke Midoni
 Pises Nmisinam
 Mige
 Lalaye
 Cesmhaye Vahsi
 Shab
 Cera Vaysadi 
 Band Sabet
 Alo
 Baba On Balast
 Zendigimo Vasat Midam
 Be Tarafe Dard
 Komak Kon
 Badtar Sod
 Nmiseh Bahat Harf Zad
 Dobareh Padesaham
 Dokhtare To Por
 Sana Heiran
 Khabam Nmibareh
 Ireke Iran & Milad
 Bikhyal
 Manam Yeki Az On Yazdahtam
 Agha Komak Kon
 Mardoman Be Esgeh
 Tatal Bichareh
 Saheb
 Energy Hastei
 Gorg
 Sohada
 Nobate Mane
 Emam Reza
 Sad Milion Rahn Kamel
 Gol
 Fati
 Gahr Nakon Na
 Baazi
 Jojeh Honari
 Holesh (with Tohi)
 Nardebon (with Sohrab MJ)
 Amanat

Music videos

References

External links 

 Amir Tataloo on SoundCloud
 
 Amir Tataloo discography at Last.fm
 
 Songs by Amir Tataloo on Radiojavan
 Songs of Amir Tataloo in Raparsi

Discographies of Iranian artists
Pop music discographies